Larisa Lăcustă (born 24 October 1979) is a retired  breaststroke and freestyle swimmer from Romania, who has competed in two Summer Olympics for her native country: in 1996 and 2004. She is best known for winning a silver medal at the 1997 FINA Short Course World Championships in Gothenburg, Sweden.

References
 

Living people
1979 births
Romanian female freestyle swimmers
Romanian female breaststroke swimmers
Swimmers at the 1996 Summer Olympics
Swimmers at the 2004 Summer Olympics
Olympic swimmers of Romania
Medalists at the FINA World Swimming Championships (25 m)
European Aquatics Championships medalists in swimming